Gorny Klyuch is a rural locality (a village) in Bakhmutsky Selsoviet, Kuyurgazinsky District, Bashkortostan, Russia. The population was 113 as of 2010. There are 3 streets.

Geography 
Gorny Klyuch is located 17 km south of Yermolayevo (the district's administrative centre) by road. Yangi-Aul is the nearest rural locality.

References 

Rural localities in Kuyurgazinsky District